The 36th AVN Awards was a pornography award show presented by Adult Video News (AVN). It took place on January 28, 2019 at the Hard Rock Hotel and Casino in Las Vegas, Nevada.

It was hosted by adult performers Romi Rain and Bailey Rayne, and comedian Esther Ku, with a musical performance by American rapper Cardi B.

Winners and Nominees 

The winners were announced during the awards ceremony on January 27, 2019.

The major performer awards went to Angela White, AVN Female Performer of the Year Award; Manuel Ferrara, Male Performer of the Year and Ivy Wolfe, Best New Starlet.

Major awards 

Winners of categories announced during the awards ceremony January 27, 2019, are highlighted in boldface and indicated with a double dagger.

Additional award winners 
The following is the list of remaining award category winners, which were announced during the awards ceremony, but presented with their awards apart from the actual event.

VIDEO AND WEB CATEGORIES

 Best Actor – Featurette: Tommy Pistol, The Weight of Infidelity, PureTaboo.com
 Best Actress – Featurette: Angela White, Who's Becky (from Games We Play), Trenchcoatx
 Best All-Girl Group Sex Scene: Ivy Wolfe, Eliza Jane, Jenna Sativa, A Flapper Girl Story
 Best All-Girl Movie: Angela Loves Women 4
 Best All-Girl Series: Women Seeking Women
 Best Anal Movie: First Anal 6
 Best Anal Series: Anal Beauty
 Best Anal Sex Scene: Angela White, Rocco Siffredi, I Am Angela
 Best Anthology Movie: Icons
 Best Art Direction: Deadpool XXX: An Axel Braun Parody
 Best BDSM Movie: Hotwife Bound 3
 Best Cinematography: Winston Henry, After Dark
 Best Comedy: Love in the Digital Age
 Best Continuing Series: Natural Beauties
 Best Director – Feature: Axel Braun, The Possession of Mrs. Hyde
 Best Director – Non-Feature: Evil Chris, I Am Angela
 Best Director – Web Channel/Site: Lee Roy Myers, WoodRocket.com
 Best Double-Penetration Sex Scene: Abigail Mac, Jax Slayher, Prince Yahshua, Abigail
 Best Editing: Evil Ricky, I Am Angela
 Best Ethnic Movie: My Asian Hotwife 3
 Best Ethnic/Interracial Series: My First Interracial
 Best Featurette: The Weight of Infidelity, PureTaboo.com
 Best Foreign Feature/Anthology Movie: A 40 Year Old Widow
 Best Foreign-Shot All-Girl Sex Scene: Megan Rain, Mina Sauvage, Undercover
 Best Foreign-Shot Anal Sex Scene: Clea Gaultier, Kristof Cale, Charlie Dean, The Prisoner
 Best Foreign-Shot Boy/Girl Sex Scene: Rose Valerie, Ricky Mancini, Rose, Escort Deluxe
 Best Foreign-Shot Group Sex Scene: Alexa Tomas, Megan Rain, Apolonia Lapiedra, Emilio Ardana, Undercover Best Gonzo Movie: A XXX Documentary Best Group Sex Scene: Tori Black, Jessa Rhodes, Mia Malkova, Abella Danger, Kira Noir, Vicki Chase, Angela White, Ana Foxxx, Bambino, Mick Blue, Ricky Johnson, Ryan Driller, Alex Jones, After Dark Best Ingénue Movie: Best New Starlets 2018 Best Interracial Movie: Interracial Icon 6 Best Lewd Propositions Movie: The Psychiatrist Best Makeup: Dusty Lynn, Cammy Ellis, Deadpool XXX: An Axel Braun Parody Best Marketing Campaign – Company Image: Vixen Media Group
 Best Marketing Campaign – Individual Project: I Am Angela, Evil Angel Films
 Best MILF Movie: MILF Performers of the Year 2018 Best New Imprint: Blacked Raw
 Best New Series: Lesbian Lessons Best Niche Movie: Evil Squirters 5 Best Niche Series: Squirt for Me Best Non-Sex Performance: Kyle Stone, Never Forgotten Best Older Woman/Younger Girl Movie: The Lesbian Experience: Women Loving Girls 3 Best Oral Movie: Gag Reflex 3 Best Oral Sex Scene: Angela White, Angela by Darkko Best Orgy/Gangbang Movie: Gangbang Me 3 Best Parody: Deadpool XXX: An Axel Braun Parody Best Polyamory Movie: Watching My Hotwife 3 Best Pro-Am/Exhibitionist Movie: Mick's Pornstar Initiations Best Screenplay: Lasse Braun, Axel Braun, Rikki Braun, The Possession of Mrs. HydeVideo and Web (ctd.)

 Best Solo/Tease Performance: Kissa Sins, The Corruption of Kissa Sins Best Soundtrack: Hamiltoe, WoodRocket
 Best Special Effects: Star Wars: The Last Temptation – A Digital Playground XXX Parody Best Star Showcase: I Am Angela Best Supporting Actor: Charles Dera, Cartel Sex Best Supporting Actress: Joanna Angel, A Trailer Park Taboo Best Taboo Relations Movie: Sibling Seductions 2 Best Three-Way Sex Scene – Boy/Boy/Girl: Honey Gold, Chris Strokes, Jules Jordan, Slut Puppies 12 Best Three-Way Sex Scene – Girl/Girl/Boy: Angela White, Kissa Sins, Markus Dupree, The Corruption of Kissa Sins Best Transsexual Movie: Aubrey Kate: TS Superstar Best Transsexual Series: Trans-Visions Best Transsexual Sex Scene: Aubrey Kate, Lance Hart, Eli Hunter, Will Havoc, Ruckus, Colby Jansen, D. Arclyte, Aubrey Kate: TS Superstar Best Virtual Reality Product/Site: NaughtyAmericaVR.com
 Best Virtual Reality Sex Scene: Marley Brinx, John Strong, Wonder Woman (A XXX Parody), VR Bangers
 Clever Title of the Year: Hamiltoe, WoodRocket
 Female Foreign Performer of the Year: Anissa Kate
 Foreign Director of the Year: Rocco Siffredi
 Mainstream Star of the Year: Stormy Daniels
 Mainstream Venture of the Year: Asa Akira, Family Guy guest appearance
 MILF Performer of the Year: Cherie DeVille
 Male Foreign Performer of the Year: Rocco Siffredi
 Most Outrageous Sex Scene: Charlotte Sartre, Margot Downonme, Tommy Pistol in "My First Boy/Girl/Puppet," The Puppet Inside Me, WoodRocket
 Niche Performer of the Year: Karla Lane

PLEASURE PRODUCTS CATEGORIES

 Best Condom Manufacturer: Okamoto
 Best Enhancement Manufacturer: Boneyard/Rascal Toys
 Best Fetish Manufacturer: Bad Dragon
 Best Lingerie or Apparel Manufacturer: Coquette
 Best Lubricant Manufacturer: Pjur
 Best Pleasure Product Manufacturer – Large: Doc Johnson
 Best Pleasure Product Manufacturer – Medium: Satisfyer
 Best Pleasure Product Manufacturer – Small: Motorbunny

RETAIL CATEGORIES

 Best Boutique: Chi Chi LaRue's, Los Angeles
 Best Retail Chain – Large (11+ stores): Hustler Hollywood
 Best Retail Chain – Medium (6-10 stores): Taf Distributing
 Best Retail Chain – Small (2-5 stores): She Bop
 Best Web Retail Store: DallasNovelty.com

FAN AWARD CATEGORIES

 Favorite BBW Porn Star: Alura Jenson
 Favorite Cam Guy: Aamir Desire
 Favorite Camming Couple: 19honeysuckle (aka Honey and Tom Christian)
 Favorite Female Porn Star: Angela White
 Favorite Indie Clip Star: Cory Chase
 Favorite Male Porn Star: Johnny Sins
 Favorite Porn Star Website: ReidMyLips.com
 Favorite Trans Cam Star: Aubrey Kate
 Favorite Trans Porn Star: Chanel Santini
 Hottest MILF: Kendra Lust
 Hottest Newcomer: Alina Lopez
 Most Epic Ass: Abella Danger
 Most Spectacular Boobs: Angela White
 Social Media Star: Riley Reid

 AVN Honorary Awards 

 Hall of Fame AVN'' on January 21, 2019, announced the 2018 inductees into its hall of fame, who were later honored with a January 22 cocktail party and then a video as the awards show opened.
 Video Branch: Asa Akira, Gabrielle Anex, Lexi Belle, Frank Bukkwyd, Maestro Claudio, Kiki Daire, Dirty Harry, Ed Hunter, Kayden Kross, Micky Lynn, Ramón Nomar, Serena, Mark Stevens, Misty Stone, India Summer
 Executive Branch: Bernard Braunstein and Ed Braunstein, Renae Orenstein-Englehart, Jim Kohls
 Internet Founders Branch: Nick Chrétien, Stan Fiskin, Mitch Fontaine

Media and entertainment 
The award show was broadcast on Showtime. Rapper Cardi B performed.

References

External links 

 

AVN Awards
2019 film awards